Muhammad Mian Soomro (born 19 August 1950) is a Pakistani politician, banker and senator who currently serves as the federal minister for Privatization. Born to a Native Sindhi family originally linked to the Soomra dynasty, he previously served as the chairman of the Senate from 2003 to 2009, the Caretaker prime minister of Pakistan from 2007 to 2008, and the acting president of Pakistan from 18 August 2008 to 9 September 2008.

Soomro hails from an influential Sindhi feudal family that has been active in national politics since 1923. His father, the late Ahmed Mian Soomro, was Deputy Speaker of the West Pakistan Assembly and a member of the Senate and helped to establish the Senate Committee Systems. He is the grandson of another politician, Khan Bahadur Haji Moula Bux Soomro. He was Caretaker Prime Minister of Pakistan from 16 November 2007 to 25 March 2008 to oversee the 2008 General Elections and became the 5th Acting President of Pakistan upon the resignation of Pervez Musharraf on 18 August 2008, both by virtue of his office of the Chairman of the Senate.

Professional life
An internationally recognised professional banker, Soomro held various top positions both at home and abroad in national and international organisations.

He has also worked in important positions for major banks:

 Bank of America
 general manager and chief executive officer of International Bank of Yemen 
 Faysal Islamic Bank of Bahrain
 MCB Bank
 Zarai Taraqiati Bank Limited formally known as Agriculture Development Bank of Pakistan
 Federal Bank of Cooperatives
 President, National Bank of Pakistan

Soomro earned great recognition for his achievements during his time with these organisations. He was also instrumental in the establishment of microcredit banking in Pakistan.

He also held a position at the board of directors of Shell Pakistan Ltd.

Governorship
Soomro's public service role started with his appointment as the Governor of Sindh on 25 May 2000.

Chairman of the Senate
Soomro resigned from the office of Sindh Governor on 26 December 2002 to contest the Senate elections. He was elected as a Senator on 23 February 2003 and was subsequently elected as Chairman of the Senate on 12 March 2003.

Caretaker Prime Minister
Soomro was appointed as caretaker prime minister on 15 November 2007, at the expiration of the term of the previous prime minister, Shaukat Aziz, ahead of a new parliamentary election. On 16 November, Soomro was sworn in as prime minister by President Pervez Musharraf. His term ended on 25 March 2008, when Syed Yousaf Raza Gilani was sworn in as prime minister.

President of Pakistan
As required by the constitution, Soomro (in his position as Chairman of the Senate) automatically became President on 18 August 2008, upon the resignation of Pervez Musharraf. The constitution also required that a new President be elected by Parliament within 30 days.

Asif Ali Zardari was elected President and subsequently sworn in on 9 September 2008, succeeding Soomro.

Trustee of ILM Trust and Member of UMT Board of Governors
Soomro is a trustee of ILM Trust and member of UMT Board of Governors. UMT is a non-profit private-sector research university located in Lahore, Pakistan. In the recent QS Rankings, UMT was placed amongst the Top 500 universities of Asia.

See also
 Acting President of Pakistan
 Prime Minister of Pakistan
 Chief Justice of Pakistan
 Chief of Army Staff of the Pakistan Army
 Constitution of Pakistan

References

|-

|-

|-

|-

1950 births
Living people
People from Jacobabad District
Muhammad Mian
Sadiq Public School alumni
Forman Christian College alumni
Pakistani bankers
Chairmen of the Senate of Pakistan
Governors of Sindh
Acting presidents of Pakistan
Caretaker prime ministers of Pakistan
Pakistani landowners
Pakistani MNAs 2018–2023
Federal ministers of Pakistan